The following is a list of rock and roll artists.

List

Richard Anthony
Chet Atkins
Hank Ballard
The Beatles
Chuck Berry
The Big Bopper
The Brian Setzer Orchestra
Johnny Burnette
Ray Campi
Goree Carter
Johnny Cash
Adriano Celentano
Ray Charles
Chubby Checker
Eddie Cochran
The Crickets
Dick Dale
Bobby Darin
Bo Diddley
Fats Domino
Bill Doggett
Drive-By Truckers
Duane Eddy
The Everly Brothers
Adam Faith
Billy Fury
Danyel Gérard
Gerry and the Pacemakers
Rosco Gordon
Bill Haley
Arch Hall Jr.
Roy Hall
Johnny Hallyday
The Head Cat
Buddy Holly
Ike & Tina Turner
Wanda Jackson
Shooter Jennings
Kid Rock 
Johnny Kidd
B.B. King
Kings of Rhythm ("Jackie Brenston and his Delta Cats")
Peter Kraus
Freddie 'Fingers' Lee
Ricky Nelson
Little Richard
Little Tony
Brenda Lee
Jerry Lee Lewis
Mina
Roy Orbison
Paul Revere and the Raiders
Carl Perkins
Phantom, Rocker & Slick
Elvis Presley
Cliff Richard
The Rolling Stones
Jack Scott
Screamin’ Jay Hawkins
Bob Seger
The Shadows
Del Shannon
Jumpin' Gene Simmons
Howie Stange
Tommy Steele
Stray Cats
Sister Rosetta Tharpe
Big Joe Turner
Conway Twitty
Ritchie Valens
Bobby Vee
Gene Vincent
Marty Wilde
Hank Williams Jr.
Larry Williams
Johnny Winter
Sheb Wooley
Link Wray

See also
 List of country music performers
 List of popular music performers
 List of rockabilly musicians

References

Bibliography

 
Rock and roll